Shrewsbury is an inner-ring suburb of St. Louis, located in St. Louis County, Missouri, United States. The population was 6,254 at the 2010 census.

History
Shrewsbury was officially platted in 1889. The land which became Shrewsbury originally belonged to Gregorie Sarpy and Charles Gratiot; by 1890, it was divided into farms and sold to families. The area now known as Shrewsbury was a  farm owned by General John Murdoch. The Murdoch farm was called Shrewsbury Park, named after a town in England.

In 1913, concerned resident Joseph Burge organized the Shrewsbury Improvement Association to improve Shrewsbury and develop its first sewer system. Shrewsbury was incorporated and became a village in 1913; shortly thereafter a sanitation system was established, reducing water-borne diseases prevalent at the time.

In 1938, the United States government offered financial aid to the city of Shrewsbury, and land was acquired for the construction of a new city hall replacing the 1912 original. The new City Hall building was completed in October 1938. Shrewsbury's new fire engine house and state-of-the-art equipment were dedicated in 1947; it was during this period that the Shrewsbury Garden Club was formed to maintain the beautiful trees and flowers throughout the city. The early 1950s were marked by the expansion of the public bus routes to connect Shrewsbury to St. Louis. The 1960s and '70s were times of great community growth, noted by the construction of city parks, a municipal pool, and Interstate 44.

The 1980s and '90s saw increased development of new homes, condominiums, apartments, shopping areas, and a new and improved City Center, which opened May 8, 1993, to coincide with Shrewsbury's 80th year of incorporation.  With the opening of the City Center, the previous City Hall building was converted to house the police and fire departments, and is now called the Public Safety Building.

Construction finished in 2006 on the Shrewsbury–Lansdowne Interstate 44 St. Louis MetroLink station on the eastern edge of the city, at Lansdowne Avenue and River Des Peres Boulevard.

Shrewsbury is home to the seminary of the Roman Catholic Archdiocese of Saint Louis, Kenrick–Glennon Seminary.

The Shrewsbury City Council in fall 2010 was expected to consider a plan to turn Kenrick Plaza, which has several open storefronts, into a Walmart store.

Geography
Shrewsbury is located at  (38.587902, -90.326989).

The city is roughly bounded by St. Louis to the east, Webster Groves to the north, Marlborough to the west and Mackenzie and Affton to the south.

Children in Shrewsbury attend Webster Groves and Affton school districts.

Demographic

2020 census

As of 2020, there were 6,406 people living in the city.

2010 census
As of the census of 2010, there were 6,254 people, 3,218 households, and 1,331 families living in the city. The racial makeup of the city was 90.4% White, 3.6% African American, 0.2% Native American, 3.9% Asian, 0.5% from other races, and 1.4% from two or more races. Hispanic or Latino of any race were 2.3% of the population.

There were 3,218 households, of which 16.3% had children under the age of 18 living with them, 32.3% were married couples living together, 7.1% had a female householder with no husband present, 2.1% had a male householder with no wife present, and 58.6% were non-families. 50.0% of all households were made up of individuals, and 23.3% had someone living alone who was 65 years of age or older. The average household size was 1.84 and the average family size was 2.76.

The median age in the city was 42.9 years. 14.2% of residents were under the age of 18; 10.4% were between the ages of 18 and 24; 27.6% were from 25 to 44; 23.5% were from 45 to 64; and 24.2% were 65 years of age or older. The gender makeup of the city was 45.3% male and 54.7% female.

2000 census
As of the census of 2000, there were 6,644 people, 3,266 households, and 1,407 families living in the city. The racial makeup of the city was 93.98% White, 1.48% African American, 0.18% Native American, 2.63% Asian, 0.02% Pacific Islander, 0.54% from other races, and 1.17% from two or more races. Hispanic or Latino of any race were 1.69% of the population.

There were 3,266 households, out of which 17.3% had children under the age of 18 living with them, 34.0% were married couples living together, 7.5% had a female householder with no husband present, and 56.9% were non-families. 47.5% of all households were made up of individuals, and 22.5% had someone living alone who was 65 years of age or older. The average household size was 1.91 and the average family size was 2.80.

In the city, the population was spread out, with 15.6% under the age of 18, 10.8% from 18 to 24, 29.8% from 25 to 44, 17.4% from 45 to 64, and 26.3% who were 65 years of age or older. The median age was 40 years. For every 100 females, there were 78.9 males. For every 100 females age 18 and over, there were 74.2 males.

The median income for a household in the city was $40,896, and the median income for a family was $57,007. Males had a median income of $40,951 versus $35,018 for females. The per capita income for the city was $27,479. About 3.1% of families and 8.7% of the population were below the poverty line, including 3.8% of those under age 18 and 5.2% of those age 65 or over.

Transportation

Public transportation 

Shrewsbury is served by the Blue Line of the St. Louis region's MetroLink light rail system. The city has one station, Shrewsbury–Lansdowne I-44, which is located within the city limits of St. Louis in the Lindenwood Park neighborhood despite being named for Shrewsbury. Metro Transit also operates the Shrewsbury Transit Center on Lansdowne Avenue, which connects the light rail station to several MetroBus routes and paratransit services.

Major roads and highways 
Major arterial routes in Shrewsbury include Big Bend Boulevard, Laclede Station Road, Lansdowne Avenue, Murdoch Avenue and Watson Road. Interstate 44 passes through the northern part of the city near Deer Creek.

References

External links
 City of Shrewsbury official website

Cities in St. Louis County, Missouri
Cities in Missouri